Menophra anaplagiata is a moth in the family Geometridae. It is found in China and Taiwan.

References

Moths described in 1984
Boarmiini